Andrew Stuart Dawson (born 20 October 1978) is an English former professional footballer and coach. He is part of the coaching staff at Hull City.

As a player he was a defender from 1997 to 2015. Having left Nottingham Forest as a youngster he joined Scunthorpe United permanently following a loan spell. He played for United on two occasions during his career having also spent ten years with Hull City.

Career

Early career
Born in Northallerton, North Yorkshire, Dawson is the elder brother of Michael Dawson (formerly of Nottingham Forest) and Kevin Dawson (formerly of Chesterfield). Like his brothers, Andy started his professional career at Nottingham Forest, but he made only one senior appearance for them before moving to Scunthorpe for £45,000.

Hull City
Dawson moved to Hull City on 16 May 2003 on a free transfer from Scunthorpe United. During his several years at the club, he has worn the captain's armband on many occasions.

Rise up the Football League
Arriving in the summer, he was quickly established as manager Peter Taylor's first choice at left-back during the two promotion seasons 2003–04 and 2004–05, and played regularly in the Championship in 2005–06 until picking up an injury.
He was named Hull City's Player of the Year in the 2006–07 season.
Dawson was also a regular in the 2007–08 season as Hull were promoted, starting for the playoff final on 24 May 2008 at Wembley.

Premier League years
Along with teammates Ian Ashbee, Boaz Myhill and Ryan France he joins an elite band of players to have taken their club up through four divisions.

In 2008 Dawson completed Soccer AM's Crossbar Challenge.

For both of Hull's first two seasons in the top flight of English football, Dawson was virtually ever-present in the side, also contributing one goal each season, both free kicks, the first against Stoke in 2009, and the second against Everton the following season.

Return to the Championship
Following Hull's relegation to the Championship, Dawson remained a constant in the side under new manager Nigel Pearson. On 3 January 2011, Dawson agreed a one-year contract extension with Hull City, due to expire in June 2012. When Nick Barmby was appointed Hull City manager, he reinstated Dawson to the starting line-up. Dawson retained his place for the remainder of the 2011–12 season, and on 7 April 2012 replaced the injured Jack Hobbs as acting captain. Following Barmby's dismissal as manager of Hull City, Dawson's future was left uncertain, especially due to the presence of the younger Joe Dudgeon as a rival for the left back position. However, on 6 July 2012 Dawson signed a new one-year deal with Hull City, earning him a testimonial, having completed ten years of service at the club through all four divisions. In the 2012–13 season, Dawson became the first player in the club's history to win four promotions, with City finishing in second place in the Championship to earn automatic promotion.

Dawson was released, however, on 16 May 2013, along with 11 other Hull City players, meaning that he would not be returning to the Premier League with Hull City.

Testimonial
On 21 November 2012, Andy Dawson officially launched a series of testimonial events, raising money for the Daisy Appeal in East Yorkshire. This was supported through social networking on Facebook and Twitter. On 10 August 2013, Hull City played Spanish side Real Betis in Andy Dawson's official testimonial game; the match ended 3–0. Before the main match, Dawson took part in a special 'legends game' involving a host of former Hull City players.

Coaching career

Scunthorpe United
It was announced on 30 May 2013, that Dawson had signed for Scunthorpe United on a one-year player/coach deal.

On 11 October 2014 Dawson took charge of Scunthorpe United along with Tony Daws in a caretaker manager role for a league game away at Gillingham, The Iron won the game 0–3.

On 24 March 2019, Dawson again took over Scunthorpe United as caretaker manager, replacing Stuart McCall until the end of the season.

Hull City
On 23 September 2019, Dawson returned to the Hull City as part of the Academy Coaching Staff.
On 13 May 2022, Dawson was promoted to first team coach following the departure of Tony Pennock. On 30 September 2022, Dawson was appointed as interim head coach after Shota Arveladze was sacked after a run of four league defeats. Dawson oversaw the team achieve nine points across the seven matches he oversaw during his interim spell, returning to the backroom staff following the permanent appointment of Liam Rosenior on 3 November 2022.

Style of play
Dawson is renowned for his long-range shots, particularly from free-kicks. He is a traditional left fullback, and when playing sports his trademark Umbro Speciali black boots, with old-fashioned white sock ties.

Family
Andy Dawson is the older brother of Nottingham Forest player Michael Dawson, and former Chesterfield defender Kevin Dawson.

Honours

Hull City
Football League Championship play-offs: 2007–08

Individual
PFA Team of the Year: 2003–04 Third Division
Hull City Player of the Year: 2006–07

References

External links

1978 births
Living people
People from Northallerton
Footballers from North Yorkshire
English footballers
Association football defenders
Nottingham Forest F.C. players
Scunthorpe United F.C. players
Hull City A.F.C. players
English Football League players
Premier League players
English football managers
Scunthorpe United F.C. managers
Hull City A.F.C. non-playing staff
Hull City A.F.C. managers
English Football League managers